Abdel Karim Obeid (born 1957) is a Sheikh and Imam of the village of Jibchit in south Lebanon, high-place of Lebanese Shiism.

Life
Regarded as the spiritual leader and soldier of the 'Islamic Amal' (no relation with the similarly named secular Resistance movement Amal, except that both catered to the Lebanese Shia community) in the south of Tyre, close to Hezbollah and related to the operations of capturing western hostages since 1982.

Abdel Karim Obeid was captured on 28 July 1989 by nearly 25 Israeli commandos in his village, Jibchit. Danny Abdalla, a Lebanese criminal living in Denmark, who also admitted to having killed Ragheb Harb on behalf of the Israelis, claimed to have participated in the kidnapping of Abdul Karim Obeyd. As a result, Hezbollah put Abdalla on their death list, and he is wanted in Lebanon. Obeid was a long time held prisoner in Israel in the famous prison 1391, near the Green Line, and later transferred to the Ashmoret penitentiary, located near Kfar Yona, north of Tel Aviv.

In exchange of his release, Israel required information on the fate of the navigator Ron Arad (crashed in southern Lebanon in October 1986) at first, and later on for the bodies of the three soldiers abducted by Hezbollah in October 2000 at the Israeli-Lebanese border and for IDF colonel (res.) Elhanan Tannenbaum, who had been kidnapped at the same time in Dubai.

He was released in January 2004 with 20 other Lebanese prisoners, 400 Palestinian prisoners and a number of other nationals, as part of a deal to get the abducted soldiers and civilians back. He thanked Hezbollah and Iranian leaders for acting for his release.

See also
List of kidnappings

References

1957 births
1980s missing person cases
Formerly missing people
Hostages
Kidnapped people
Lebanese imams
Lebanese Shia Muslims
Living people
Missing person cases in Lebanon
Prisoners and detainees of Israel
South Lebanon conflict (1985–2000)